Katie Sarife is an American actress. She is best known for playing Daniela Rios in the 2019 supernatural horror film Annabelle Comes Home.

Career
She appeared in the episode Fan Fiction of the television series Supernatural and in Youth & Consequences. She played Soledad Fuentes in the 2015 NBC drama film The Curse of the Fuentes Women, starring Adan Canto and Christina Vidal. In 2019, she appeared as Daniela Rios in the supernatural horror film Annabelle Comes Home, directed by Gary Dauberman.

Filmography

References

External links
 
 

Living people
1993 births
21st-century American actresses
Actresses from Texas
American child actresses
American film actresses
American television actresses
People from McKinney, Texas